Mumbai Indians are a franchise cricket team based in Mumbai that play in the Indian Premier League (IPL). They are one of eight teams that competed in the 2017 Indian Premier League.  Rohit Sharma was the captain of the team for the fifth season in succession, while Mahela Jayawardene was in his first season as the team's coach. The Mumbai Indians drew an average home attendance of 26,000 in the 2017 Indian Premier League. Mumbai Indians won the 2017 IPL Final by defeating Rising Pune Supergiants by 1 run thus winning their 3rd title.

Offseason

 In November 2016, Mahela Jayawardene was appointed head coach, replacing Ricky Ponting.

Auction

The player auction for the 2017 Indian Premier League was held on 20 February in Bangalore. 
The Mumbai Indians bought the following players at the auction:

Nicholas Pooran
Mitchell Johnson
K Gowtham
Karn Sharma
Saurabh Tiwary
Asela Gunaratne
Kulwant Khejroliya

Squad 
 Players with international caps are listed in bold.

Season standings

Match summary

Matches

Playoffs
Qualifier 1

Qualifier 2

Final

References

External links
Official Website

2017 Indian Premier League
Mumbai Indians seasons